Drane W. Scrivener (born January 28, 1951), formerly known as Drane Crumes, is a former American football cornerback. He played college football at the University of Tulsa and was selected as a first-team player on the 1972 All-America college football team. He also played professional football in the World Football League for the Birmingham Americans and Chicago Fire during the 1974 WFL season.

Early years
Scrivener was born in 1951 in Louisville, Kentucky. He attended Louisville's Male High School where he was co-captain of the track team. At the Kentucky state meet in May 1969, he led Male to a state championship, tallying 20 of the school's 41 points. He won the 180-yard low hurdles and the long jump and placed second in the 100-yard dash and the triple jump.

College career
In the fall of 1969, Scrivener enrolled at Cisco Junior College in Cisco, Texas. After one year at Cisco, he transferred as a sophomore to the University of Tulsa. During the 1970 season, he was a backup halfback for the 1970 Tulsa Golden Hurricane football team. He tallied 103 rushing yards on 19 carries for an average of 5.4 yards per carry.

As a junior in 1971, Scrivener asked to be transferred to the defensive secondary and became a full-time starter at cornerback. As a senior, he was selected as the most valuable player on the 1972 Tulsa Golden Hurricane football team, as he led Tulsa's secondary to a No. 3 national ranking in pass defense. After the 1972 season, he received All-Missouri Valley Conference honors. He was also selected by the Newspaper Enterprise Association (NEA) as a first-team defensive back on the 1972 All-America college football team. 

Scrivener also played in the Blue–Gray Football Classic and the 1973 American Bowl. He returned a punt for 71 yards in the American Bowl. He also competed in the long jump for the Tulsa track team.

Professional football
Scrivener was selected by the Dallas Cowboys in the fourth round (98th overall) of the 1973 NFL Draft. He attended the Cowboys' training camp, but he contracted a virus in his chest and was advised by his doctor not to play during the 1972 season. He was released by the Cowboys in September 1973.

In February 1974, Scrivener signed a multi-year contract with the Birmingham Americans of the World Football League (WFL). He was released on September 18.

In 1975, Scrivener was signed by the Dallas Cowboys as a free agent, but was released after a team doctor concluded that he was unable to play due to a back injury sustained in college and an abnormal heartbeat that he had since childhood. Scrivener noted at the time that a doctor had cleared him to play in Birmingham one year earlier, and he believed he was being given the run-around. Scrivener chose not to return to the WFL and retired from football.

Later years and honors
After his football career ended, Scrivener became a fire inspector for the Louisville Fire Department. He is also a published author on fire safety issues involving children with special needs, newborns, and older adults.

In 1990, he was inducted into the University of Tulsa Athletics Hall of Fame. In 1999, he was named to the third-team on the Tulsa Football All-Century Team.

References

1951 births
Living people
Sportspeople from Louisville, Kentucky
Writers from Louisville, Kentucky
Players of American football from Kentucky
American football cornerbacks
Cisco Wranglers football players
Tulsa Golden Hurricane football players
Birmingham Americans players
Chicago Fire (WFL) players
Dallas Cowboys players